Crary Mills is a hamlet in St. Lawrence County, New York, United States.  It consists of the southeastern corner of the Town of Canton and parts of the towns of Potsdam and Pierrepont.

Hamlets in New York (state)
Hamlets in St. Lawrence County, New York